Australasia was the name of a combined team from Australia and New Zealand that competed at the 1908 Summer Olympics in London, United Kingdom. It was the fourth appearance of Australia, which had not missed any edition of the Summer Olympic Games, and the first appearance of New Zealand.  The two would compete together again as Australasia at the 1912 Summer Olympics before competing separately at every edition of the Summer Games since. In 1908 there were three New Zealanders, Harry Kerr, Henry Murray and Albert Rowland (a fourth New Zealander, hurdler Arthur Halligan, competed for Great Britain); all other competitors were Australian. There were 30 competitors for Australasia who competed in 20 events in six sports. A further two competitors, who were to compete in tennis, did not play as their nominations failed to reach the organisers.

Medallists

Athletics

Track & road events

Field events

Boxing

Diving

Rugby

Australasia won the only rugby union match played in 1908 against Great Britain, earning the gold medal.  The Australasian representative was the Australia national team.

Shooting

Swimming

Tennis
Les Poidevin and Anthony Wilding (who were partners in the 1906 Davis Cup preliminary round at Newport) were nominated for the Australasian team by the Australasian Lawn Tennis Association, but their nominations failed to reach the organisers. So the pair watched the "small, impoverished and out of place" Australasian contingent alongside the "tailored splendour" of some European teams. Although many leading tennis players bypassed the Olympic tournament (which followed almost immediately after Wimbledon) and his goal had been Wimbledon, Wilding regretted the missed opportunity and endorsed his mother's summing up of the administrative bungling: "seems very careless of them & very annoying".

References

External links
Cover of 1908 programme

Sources
 
 

Nations at the 1908 Summer Olympics
1908
1908
Olympics
Olympics